Beast Moans is the debut album by Canadian indie rock supergroup Swan Lake, released in November 2006 on the label Jagjaguwar. It was recorded at Dead Wood Studios in Shawnigan Lake, British Columbia as well as at a house in Victoria, British Columbia.

Track listing
 "Widow's Walk" (Daniel Bejar)
 "Nubile Days" (Spencer Krug)
 "City Calls" (Carey Mercer)
 "A Venue Called Rubella" (Bejar)
 "All Fires" (Krug)
 "The Partisan But He's Got to Know" (Mercer)
 "The Freedom" (Bejar)
 "Petersburg, Liberty Theater, 1914" †
 "The Pollenated Girls" (Mercer)
 "Bluebird" (Krug)
 "Pleasure Vessels" (Mercer)
 "Are You Swimming in Her Pools?" (Krug)
 "Shooting Rockets" (Bejar)

 † The writer of "Petersburg, Liberty Theater, 1914" is currently unknown.

External links

Jagjaguwar's Swan Lake Homepage

References 

2006 debut albums
Swan Lake (band) albums
Jagjaguwar albums